Levy Thorpe (18 November 1889 – 1935) was an English professional footballer who played as a wing half. He made 98 appearances for  Blackpool, all of which were in consecutive games. 92 of these were in the Football League; the other six were in the FA Cup.

Career
Thorpe made his debut for Blackpool late in the 1910–11 campaign, in a 2–0 victory against Leicester Fosse at Bloomfield Road on 29 March 1911. He went on to appear in their six remaining League games, beginning a long run of consecutive appearances for the club.

The following season, 1911–12, he was an ever-present, appearing in the number-4 jersey in all of Blackpool's 42 League and FA Cup games. He also scored his first and only goal for the club. It came in a 2–0 victory over Nottingham Forest at Bloomfield Road on 23 March 1912.

The ever-present record was preserved the following 1912–13 season, at the end of which he had made 89 consecutive appearances for the Tangerines.

In 1913–14, Thorpe appeared in the first 9 League games, continuing his appearance streak to 98 games, before being sold to Lancashire rivals Burnley. However, during World War I, he returned to Blackpool as a guest player.

Personal life 
Thorpe served as a private in the Loyal North Lancashire Regiment during the First World War.

References

1889 births
1935 deaths
Sportspeople from Seaham
Footballers from County Durham
English footballers
Blackpool F.C. players
Burnley F.C. players
Blackpool F.C. wartime guest players
Blackburn Rovers F.C. players
Lincoln City F.C. players
Rochdale A.F.C. players
English Football League players
British Army personnel of World War I
Loyal Regiment soldiers
Association football wing halves